Charlotte Amalie High School (CAHS) is a public high school housing a population of just over 1400 students, and over 130 members of faculty and staff. It is located in what is colloquially called the "town area" of the island of St. Thomas, United States Virgin Islands. It is named after the official name for the "town area," Charlotte Amalie. It is a part of the St. Thomas-St. John School District. It is the territory's most populous high school.

History 
CAHS was established in 1920 as a junior high school. In 1930, the first 12th grade class was added, and four students graduated in the class of 1931. It is popularly known as "High School" to older residents of St. Thomas, because it was the first public high school opened on the island. It was named after Charlotte Amalie of Hesse-Kassel (or Hesse-Cassel), the queen consort of Denmark and Norway, (the wife of King Christian V). The school had two other locations prior to where it currently stands. The first location was at the Commandant Gade Site, and the second was at what is now the Senate (Earl B. Ottley Legislative) Building. The Charlotte Amalie High School moved to its current location in 1955.

Extracurricular activities
Charlotte Amalie High's Mighty, Mighty Chickenhawks have been exceptional performers in many of the extracurricular activities and sports present in the Virgin Islands.

The athletes of CAHS have claimed multiple IAA (Interscholastic Athletic Association) titles in baseball, basketball, flag football, tackle football, soccer, softball, track & field, and volleyball.

CAHS always fields a strong team for the annual Virgin Islands Appellate High School Moot Court Competition held in the territory. After taking first place in 2013, 2014, and 2015, Charlotte Amalie High School also became the first to claim three consecutive victories in the competition. CAHS also claimed first-place finishes in the competition in 2011 and 2009. The school also has excellent showings in the territorial JROTC Caribbean Drill Competitions, Poetry Out Loud, various Quiz Bowls, and the ever expanding Rock City Classic: Battle of the Bands (current and four-time repeat champions). The 2008 National Champion of the  Poetry Out Loud competition hailed from the Charlotte Amalie High School. Her win was impressive because that was the first year that the Virgin Islands was allowed to participate. Also of note is the fact that the St. Thomas Carnival Queen, for 19 consecutive years (1999-2017), came from Charlotte Amalie High School.

While the CAHS Hawks compete against the Antilles Hurricanes, All-Saints Vikings, Saints Peter and Paul Jaguars, Virgin Islands Montessori School Volts, Seventh Day Adventist Crusaders, and the Wesleyan Academy in the St. Thomas / St John District, they hold a long-standing and intense rivalry with the Ivanna Eudora Kean High School Dynamic Dynamite Rays.

Notable alumni

Jabari Blash, professional baseball player
 Elrod Hendricks, baseball player
 John "Dah Rock" Jackson, boxer
 Julius "The Chef" Jackson, boxer
 Al McBean, baseball player
 Akeel Morris (born 1992), MLB pitcher in the San Francisco Giants organization
 Pressure, reggae musician
 Reuben Rogers, jazz bassist
 Tregenza Roach (born 1959), Lieutenant Governor of the Virgin Islands
 Rashawn Ross, trumpeter and arranger
 Terence Todman, former U.S. Ambassador to Argentina
 Renaldo Turnbull, football player

References

External links
 

High schools in the United States Virgin Islands
Educational institutions established in 1920
St. Thomas-St. John School District
1920 establishments in the United States Virgin Islands
Charlotte Amalie, U.S. Virgin Islands